Silene hicesiae is a species of plant in the family Caryophyllaceae. It is endemic to Panarea and Alicudi, which form part of the Aeolian archipelago, a commune of Sicily, Italy.  Its natural habitats are Mediterranean-type shrubby vegetation and rocky areas. It is threatened by habitat loss.

References

Endemic flora of Sicily
hicesiae
Critically endangered plants
Taxonomy articles created by Polbot
Taxa named by Salvatore Brullo
Plants described in 1984